The Tuntang is a major river of northern Central Java, Indonesia, about 400 km east of the capital Jakarta. It connects Lake Rawa Pening to the Java Sea, east of Semarang. There is a hydroelectric powerstation on the river near the lake.

Geography
The river flows in the central area of Java with predominantly tropical monsoon climate (designated as Am in the Köppen-Geiger climate classification). The annual average temperature in the area is 21 °C. The warmest month is September, when the average temperature is around 24 °C, and the coldest is June, at 20 °C. The average annual rainfall is 3140 mm. The wettest month is January, with an average of 560 mm rainfall, and the driest is September, with 14 mm rainfall.

See also
List of rivers of Indonesia
List of rivers of Java

References

External links 

 Watershed area of Tuntang
 List of river area systems in Central Java

Rivers of Central Java
Rivers of Indonesia